TCB is a 1968 television special produced by Motown Productions and George Schlatter–Ed Friendly Productions of Laugh-In fame. The special is a musical revue starring Motown's two most popular groups at the time, Diana Ross & the Supremes and The Temptations. Containing a combination of showtunes, specially prepared numbers, and popular Motown hits, the special was taped before a live studio audience in September 1968 and originally broadcast December 9, 1968 on NBC, sponsored by the Timex watch corporation. The title of the program uses a then-popular acronym, "TCB", which stands for "Taking Care of Business".

Among the program's highlights were Diana Ross' "Afro Vogue" solo spot, Paul Williams' emotionally charged rendition of "For Once in My Life," a cover by both groups of the Aretha Franklin version of Otis Redding's "Respect," and then-new Temptations lead singer Dennis Edwards' lead performance on "(I Know) I'm Losing You," a song considered a signature for his predecessor, David Ruffin.

Pre-empting Laugh-In on Monday night, TCB was the first musical TV special of the rock era to air on American broadcast television. It exceeded all performance expectations, winning its timeslot in the ratings and becoming the top-rated variety show of 1968. A soundtrack album, TCB – The Original Cast Soundtrack was released a week before the special aired on December 9 and reached No. 1 on the U.S. Billboard Top 200 albums chart. It also became the third #1 album for Diana Ross and The Supremes. The first #1 was "The Supremes A Go Go" in 1966 by The Supremes And the second was Diana Ross and the Supremes Greatest Hits in 1967.

As of December 2021, the show has not been officially released on home video. Various clips are available for viewing online by streaming media, including YouTube.

The vinyl LP soundtrack album has been remastered and reissued on CD.

Cast
Diana Ross & the Supremes:
Diana Ross
Mary Wilson
Cindy Birdsong
The Temptations:
Dennis Edwards
Eddie Kendricks
Paul Williams
Melvin Franklin
Otis Williams

Songs in TV Special
"TCB"
"Stop! In the Name of Love"
Introduction of Diana Ross & the Supremes
"You Keep Me Hangin' On"
Introduction of the Temptations
"Get Ready"
"My Girl" Introduction of Diana Ross
"The Way You Do the Things You Do"
Medley:
"A Taste of Honey"
"Eleanor Rigby"
"Do You Know the Way to San Jose"
"Mrs. Robinson"
"Respect"
Medley:
"Reflections" 
"Afro-Vogue" (dance instrumental)
"Somewhere"
"Ain't Too Proud to Beg"
Introduction of the Temptations
"Hello, Young Lovers"
"For Once in My Life"
"(I Know) I'm Losing You"
"With a Song in My Heart"/"Without a Song"
Medley:
"Come See About Me"
"My World Is Empty Without You"
"Baby Love"
"I Hear a Symphony"
"The Impossible Dream"

Song list for TCB soundtrack album
Lead vocalists on each track are identified by superscripts: (a) Diana Ross, (b) Dennis Edwards, (c) Eddie Kendricks, (d) Paul Williams, (e) Otis Williams, (f) Temptations Ensemble

Side one
"TCB" (Bill Angelos, Buz Kohan) – 2:55 a, f
"Stop! In the Name of Love" (Holland-Dozier-Holland) – 1:12 a
Introduction of Diana Ross & the Supremes – 0:55
"You Keep Me Hangin' On" (Holland-Dozier-Holland) – 1:48 a
Introduction of the Temptations/"Get Ready" (Smokey Robinson) – 2:34 a, c
Introduction of Diana Ross/"The Way You Do the Things You Do" (Robinson, Robert Rogers) – 3:23 b, a, c
Medley – 5:15
"A Taste of Honey" (Bobby Scot, Ric Marlow) c
"Eleanor Rigby" (John Lennon, Paul McCartney) a
"Do You Know the Way to San Jose" (Burt Bacharach, Hal David) a
"Mrs. Robinson" (Paul Simon) a, f
"Respect" (Otis Redding) – 2:37 d, a
"Somewhere" (Leonard Bernstein, Stephen Sondheim) – 3:07 a

Side two
"Ain't Too Proud to Beg" (Norman Whitfield, Edward Holland Jr.) – 2:05 b
Introduction of the Temptations – 0:45
"Hello, Young Lovers" (Richard Rodgers, Oscar Hammerstein II) – 2:17 f
"For Once in My Life" (Ron Miller, Orlando Muller) – 3:43 d, e
"(I Know) I'm Losing You" (Whitfield, E. Holland) – 3:07 b
"With a Song in My Heart/Without a Song" (Richard Rodgers, Lorenz Hart, Vincent Youmans, Edward Eliscu, Billy Rose) – 3:00 a
Medley (Holland-Dozier-Holland) – 2:20 a
"Come See About Me"
"My World Is Empty Without You"
"Baby Love"
"I Hear a Symphony" (Holland-Dozier-Holland) – 2:47 a
"The Impossible Dream" (Joe Darion, Mitch Leigh) – 3:10  a, d

Charts

Weekly charts

Year-end charts

Certifications

Awards for TV special

The show received an Emmy Nomination for Outstanding Individual Achievement in Electronic Production.

See also

 G.I.T. on Broadway, 1969 follow-up special

References

External links
 

1960s American television specials
1968 television specials
1968 soundtrack albums
Music television specials
Television soundtracks
The Supremes soundtracks
The Temptations soundtracks
Motown soundtracks